Harry "Red" Batstone (September 5, 1899 – March 10, 1972) was a Canadian football player who played three seasons in the Interprovincial Rugby Football Union for the Toronto Argonauts and six seasons in the intercollegiate union for Queen's University. He was inducted into the Canadian Football Hall of Fame in the founding cohort in 1963, and into the Canada's Sports Hall of Fame in 1975.

References

 Canada's Sports Hall of Fame profile

1899 births
1972 deaths
Sportspeople from Hamilton, Ontario
Players of Canadian football from Ontario
Toronto Argonauts players
Queen's Golden Gaels football players
Canadian football running backs
Canadian Football Hall of Fame inductees